Belomestnoye is a rural locality (a selo) and the administrative center of Belomestnenskoye Rural Settlement, Belgorodsky District, Belgorod Oblast, Russia. The population was 1,210 as of 2010. There are 39 streets.

Geography 
Belomestnoye is located 27 km northeast of Maysky (the district's administrative centre) by road. Shishino is the nearest rural locality.

References 

Rural localities in Belgorodsky District
Belgorodsky Uyezd